Neogurelca hyas, the even-banded hawkmoth, is a moth of the family Sphingidae first described by Francis Walker in 1856.

Distribution 
It is known from India, Sri Lanka, Nepal, Myanmar, central and southern China, Taiwan, southern Japan, Thailand, Vietnam, Malaysia (Peninsular), Indonesia (Sumatra, Java) and the Philippines.

Description 
The wingspan is 34–40 mm.

Biology 
It is a crepuscular species which visits flowers, such as Duranta erecta in Hong Kong, before it is fully dark.
The larvae have been recorded feeding on Paederia scandens and Serissa foetida in southern China, Paederia foetida in northeastern India and Morinda species in southern India.

References

Neogurelca
Moths described in 1856
Moths of Japan